The K-12 Education Administration (K12EA) is the agency of the Ministry of Education of the Taiwan (ROC) responsible for formulating, executing and supervising educational policies and systems for senior high school education and below in Taiwan.

History
The agency was originally established as the Department of Education on 25 August 1945 in Taipei. In 1947, it became the subordinate of Taiwan Provincial Government. On 1 August 1956, it was moved to Wufeng Township, Taichung County. In July 1999, it became the subordinate of Ministry of Education. On 1 January 2013, it was renamed as K-12 Education Administration.

Organizational structure

Operational divisions
 Division of Academic and Vocational Senior High Education
 Division of Junior High, Elementary School and Preschool Education
 Division of Indigenous People and Special Education
 Division of Student Affairs and Campus Security

Administrative divisions
 Office of the Secretary
 Office of Personnel
 Office of Civil Service and Ethics
 Office of Accounting

List of Director-Generals (K-12 Education Administration period)
 Wu Ching-shan (January 2013 – July 2015)
 Lin Teng-jiao (August 2015 – December 2015) (Acting)
 Huang Zi-teng (December 2015 – August 2016)
 Qiu Qian-guo (August 2016 – September 2018)
 Xu Li-juan (September 2018 – December 2018) (Acting)
 Peng Fu-yuan (December 2018 –) (Incumbent)

See also
 Ministry of Education (Taiwan)

References

External links

 

2013 establishments in Taiwan
Educational organizations based in Taiwan
Organizations based in Taichung